Histoi or Isti was a town of ancient Greece on the north coast of the island of Icaria, with a tolerably good roadstead. Nearby, was a temple of Artemis called Tauropolion.

Its site is located near modern Evdilos.

References

Populated places in the ancient Aegean islands
Former populated places in Greece
Icaria